"Svegliarsi la mattina" (en: To Wake up in the Morning) is a pop song by Italian duo Zero Assoluto, released as the second single from the album, Appena prima di partire, on February 28, 2006.

The Zero Assoluto performed this song at the Sanremo Music Festival 2006 and, in the Evening of Duets, the group was joined by Niccolò Fabi. Their performance enabled them to reach #2 in the "Group" category.

The single become the best selling single in Italy in 2006 and was certified Gold in the country.

Track list
Svegliarsi la mattina
Semplicemente
Svegliarsi la mattina (music video)
Semplicemente (music video)

Music video
The "Svegliarsi la mattina" music video was shot in Rome by director Cosimo Alema, on an idea of Matteo Maffucci and Thomas De Gasperi. The video features guest appearances by Danilo Pao and Enrico Sognato, the "Scendi" producers. The music video reached #1 on Nielsen Music Control.

2006 singles
Zero Assoluto songs
Number-one singles in Italy
Sanremo Music Festival songs